Mehsoda is a small village in Jamui District of Bihar, India.

References

Villages in Jamui district